Pleasant Harbor State Park is a marine state park located off Highway 101,  south of Brinnon in Jefferson County, Washington. The park is a one-acre moorage facility for fishing, boating, and scuba diving only and no other services.

Pleasant Harbor and the adjoining Black Point Peninsula, which separates the harbor from Hood Canal, are the subject of an ongoing  
process for the development of a Master Planned Resort under the auspices of the Jefferson County Department of Community Development.

References

External links
Pleasant Harbor State Park Property Washington State Parks and Recreation Commission

Parks in Jefferson County, Washington
State parks of Washington (state)
Protected areas established in 1955